Adrian Clarke may refer to:

 Adrian Clark (boxer) (born 1986), American boxer
 Adrian Clarke (footballer) (born 1974), English footballer
 Adrian Clarke (photographer), English photographer
 Adrian Clarke (poet), English poet
 Adrian Clark (producer) of Can't You See That She's Mine
 Adrian Clarke (rugby union) (born 1938), New Zealand rugby union player
 Adrian Clarke (Canadian football) (born 1991), Canadian football player

See also
 Adrien Clarke (born 1981), American football player
 Adrienne Clarkson (born 1939), Hong Kong-born Canadian journalist and stateswoman who served as Governor General of Canada (1999–2005)